Ernst Kozlicek (born 27 January 1931) is an Austrian football midfielder who played for Austria in the 1958 FIFA World Cup. He also played for FC Admira Wacker Mödling, LASK Linz, SV Schwechat, and SK Sturm Graz.

References

External links
FIFA profile
 
 

1931 births
Austrian footballers
Austria international footballers
Association football midfielders
FC Admira Wacker Mödling players
LASK players
SK Sturm Graz players
1958 FIFA World Cup players
Living people
Footballers from Vienna